The New Smyrna Beach Historic District is a U.S. historic district (designated as such on April 26, 1990) located in New Smyrna Beach, Florida. The district is bounded by Riverside Drive, U.S. 1, Ronnoc Lane, and Smith Street. It contains 312 historic buildings.

References

Further reading
 Grange, Roger. "Saving Eighteenth-Century New Smyrnea: Public Archaeology in Action." Present Pasts vol 3 #1 (2011). online

External links
 Volusia County listings at National Register of Historic Places

National Register of Historic Places in Volusia County, Florida
Historic districts on the National Register of Historic Places in Florida
New Smyrna Beach, Florida